This is a list of municipalities in Cape Verde having standing links to local communities in other countries. In most cases, the association, especially when formalised by local government, is known as "town twinning" (though other terms, such as "partner towns" (geminações) or "sister cities" are sometimes used instead).

B
Boa Vista

 Aljezur, Portugal
 Anadia, Portugal
 Cabeceiras de Basto, Portugal
 Felgueiras, Portugal
 Loulé, Portugal
 Seixal, Portugal
 Zocca, Italy

Brava

 Cartaxo, Portugal
 Santarém, Portugal

M
Maio

 Arraiolos, Portugal
 Loures, Portugal
 São João da Madeira, Portugal
 Vila Nova de Poiares, Portugal

Mosteiros

 Amadora, Portugal
 Ansião, Portugal
 Azambuja, Portugal
 Entroncamento, Portugal

P
Paul
 Ribeira Grande, Portugal

Porto Novo

 Angra do Heroísmo, Portugal
 Madalena, Portugal
 Ribeira Grande, Portugal
 Tavira, Portugal

Praia

 Boston, United States
 Faro, Portugal
 Figueira da Foz, Portugal
 Fortaleza, Brazil
 Funchal, Portugal
 Gondomar, Portugal
 Jinan, China
 Lisbon, Portugal
 Macau, China
 Ponta Delgada, Portugal
 Providence, United States
 Rio de Janeiro, Brazil

R
Ribeira Brava

 Abrantes, Portugal
 Beja, Portugal
 Braga, Portugal
 Maia, Portugal
 Ovar, Portugal
 Santo André, Brazil
 Silves, Portugal

Ribeira Grande

 Caldas da Rainha, Portugal
 Ribeira Grande, Portugal
 Torres Novas, Portugal
 Viana do Castelo, Portugal

Ribeira Grande de Santiago

 Angra do Heroísmo, Portugal
 Guimarães, Portugal
 Lagos, Portugal
 Ribeira Grande, Portugal
 Tomar, Portugal

S
Sal

 Albufeira, Portugal
 Almada, Portugal
 Belmonte, Portugal
 Cascais, Portugal
 Desenzano del Garda, Italy
 Fortaleza, Brazil
 Lourinhã, Portugal
 Macedo de Cavaleiros, Portugal
 Maia, Portugal
 Sanya, China

Santa Catarina

 Hattersheim am Main, Germany
 Saint-Denis, France
 Vila Franca de Xira, Portugal

Santa Catarina do Fogo

 Miranda do Corvo, Portugal 
 Vila Nova da Barquinha, Portugal

Santa Cruz

 Alfândega da Fé, Portugal
 Aveiro, Portugal
 Candiolo, Italy
 Lagoa, Portugal
 Sines, Portugal

São Domingos

 Barcelos, Portugal
 Lagoa, Portugal
 Madalena, Portugal

São Filipe

 Fortaleza, Brazil

 Matosinhos, Portugal
 Montijo, Portugal
 Ourém, Portugal
 Palmela, Portugal
 Sesimbra, Portugal
 Viseu, Portugal
 Ziguinchor, Senegal

São Lourenço dos Órgãos
 Anadia, Portugal

São Miguel

São Salvador do Mundo

São Vicente

 Angra do Heroísmo, Portugal
 Aquiraz, Brazil
 Benguela, Angola
 Coimbra, Portugal
 Felgueiras, Portugal
 Mafra, Portugal
 New Bedford, United States
 Oeiras, Portugal
 Portalegre, Portugal
 Portimão, Portugal
 Porto, Portugal

 Vagos, Portugal
 Vila Nova de Famalicão, Portugal

T
Tarrafal

 Amadora, Portugal
 Grândola, Portugal
 Marinha Grande, Portugal
 Mé-Zóchi, São Tomé and Príncipe
 Moita, Portugal
 Ponte de Sor, Portugal
 Povoação, Portugal

 Vila Franca de Xira, Portugal

Tarrafal de São Nicolau

 Braga, Portugal
 Maia, Portugal

References

Cape Verde
Municipalities of Cape Verde
Foreign relations of Cape Verde
Cape Verde geography-related lists
Cities in Cape Verde
Populated places in Cape Verde